Juan Francisco Torres Belén (born 9 January 1985), known as Juanfran, is a Spanish former professional footballer who played as a right-back.

After starting out at Real Madrid, he went on to make a name for himself in La Liga with Osasuna and Atlético Madrid, signing for the latter club in 2011 and going on to win seven major titles, including the 2014 national championship and the 2012 and 2018 Europa League tournaments. He totalled 427 appearances in Spain's top flight.

A Spanish international since 2012, Juanfran was part of the squad that won that year's European Championship, and also represented the nation at the 2014 World Cup and Euro 2016.

Club career

Real Madrid
Born in Crevillent, Alicante, Valencian Community, Juanfran was a product of Real Madrid's youth academy. He had his first main squad opportunity on 24 January 2004, playing 15 minutes in a 2–1 home win against Villarreal CF after solid performances with the B team. Over that and the following seasons, he would play a further five La Liga matches.

Juanfran was loaned out to RCD Espanyol for 2005–06 and, although the Catalan side barely avoided relegation, he featured heavily throughout the campaign, scoring on 22 March 2006 in a 1–1 draw at Athletic Bilbao. He started his career as a winger.

Osasuna
Juanfran signed with CA Osasuna after a deal that allowed Osasuna to get the player without having to pay a transfer fee and with per-set price of €10 million, adding several specifics, which included a possibility of a January 2007 recall by Madrid who also retained a buying option at the end of the season. He played his first game for the Navarrese on 24 September 2006 in a 2–0 away victory over RC Celta de Vigo, and scored the second goal of the match. Additionally, he appeared in nine games and netted once in their semi-final run in the UEFA Cup.

In 2008–09, Juanfran was again an everpresent fixture in Osasuna's lineups. On 31 May 2009, in the last matchday, he scored from 30 yards in a 2–1 home defeat of former side Real Madrid, which kept the club in the top flight for another year. In the following campaign, as the former fared better in the league by finishing 12th, he scored a career-best four goals.

Atlético Madrid

On 11 January 2011, Juanfran signed for Atlético Madrid until June 2015 for a fee of just over €4 million. He made his official debut two days later, starting in a 3–1 away loss against his first professional club Real Madrid in the quarter-finals of the Copa del Rey.

Juanfran scored his first goal for Atlético on 21 May 2011, in a 4–3 win at RCD Mallorca – the last game of the season – dedicating it to his father who had died two weeks beforehand. In 2011–12 he began being regularly played as a right back, by both Gregorio Manzano and his successor, Diego Simeone. In the Europa League final, which his team won 3–0 against Bilbao, he played in that position; after the match, he dedicated the triumph to his late father, saying "My baby son Oliver is here with me; the only words he knows are 'mama' and 'Atleti',I dedicate this win to my family and to my dad, who passed away last year. I know he's up there looking down on us celebrating now."

On 24 May 2014, Juanfran played all 120 minutes of the Champions League Final, lost 4–1 to Real Madrid at the Estádio da Luz. He signed a contract extension one month later, running until 2018.

Juanfran started both legs of the round-of-16 Champions League tie against PSV Eindhoven; on 15 March 2016, in the second match, he took the decisive penalty in the 8–7 shootout win (0–0 on aggregate). In the final of the competition, also decided on penalties after a 1–1 draw in Milan, he was the only player to fail to convert in an eventual defeat to his former club Real Madrid.

Juanfran left Atlético upon the expiration of his contract on 30 June 2019, having made 355 appearances and won seven trophies for the club.

São Paulo
On 3 August 2019, Juanfran joined São Paulo FC on a contract running until December 2020. He became the second Spanish footballer to play for the Brazilian club, after Fernando Carazzo Castro in 1936. He made his debut in the Campeonato Brasileiro Série A fifteen days later, a 1–0 home victory over Ceará Sporting Club.

In February 2021 – with his second season having overrun due to the COVID-19 pandemic – Juanfran was released, having totalled 56 games for the Tricolor. Having retired, he returned to Spain and joined the Intercity futsal club in his hometown in July.

International career

Youth
Juanfran had an extraordinary performance at the 2004 UEFA European Under-19 Championship, as Spain won the tournament and the player received the Golden Player award. In a rare achievement, he took part in two FIFA World Youth Championships, the first in the United Arab Emirates where the national team took the silver medal; in the 2005 edition they reached the quarter-finals, eventually ousted by winners Argentina.

Senior
Juanfran made his full side debut on 26 May 2012, playing the entire match in a 2–0 friendly win with Serbia in St. Gallen, as a right-back. He was selected by manager Vicente del Bosque for his squad for UEFA Euro 2012, being an unused player as Spain won the tournament in Poland and Ukraine.

On 16 November 2013, Juanfran scored his first international goal, playing the entire 2–1 friendly victory in Equatorial Guinea. However, this match was ruled invalid by FIFA as they had not been notified early enough that the referee would be from Equatorial Guinea.

Juanfran was named in Spain's 30-man provisional squad for the 2014 FIFA World Cup, and was also included in the final list. With the country already eliminated, he made his tournament debut in the last group game against Australia, playing the whole 90 minutes and assisting David Villa for the first goal of a 3–0 win.

Juanfran featured in the roster for Euro 2016, where he played all of his team's four games. After two years in the international wilderness, in October 2018 the 33-year-old stated that he was still available for selection by the national side.

Style of play
A former winger, Juanfran usually played as a right-back. While an accomplished defender, he was also known for his ability to get forward and provide accurate crosses for teammates inside the box.

Personal life
Juanfran married Verónica Sierras, with whom he had two children, Óliver and Alexia.

Career statistics

Club

International
Appearances and goals by national team and year

Scores and results list Spain's goal tally first, score column indicates score after each Juanfran goal.

Honours
Espanyol
Copa del Rey: 2005–06

Atlético Madrid
La Liga: 2013–14
Copa del Rey: 2012–13
Supercopa de España: 2014; runner-up: 2013
UEFA Europa League: 2011–12, 2017–18
UEFA Super Cup: 2012, 2018
UEFA Champions League runner-up: 2013–14, 2015–16

Spain U19
UEFA European Under-19 Championship: 2004

Spain U20
FIFA World Youth Championship runner-up: 2003

Spain
UEFA European Championship: 2012

Individual
La Liga Team of the Season: 2013–14
UEFA Champions League Squad of the Season: 2015–16
UEFA La Liga Team of the Season: 2015–16

See also
List of Atlético Madrid players (+100)
List of La Liga players (400+ appearances)

Notes

References

External links

1985 births
Living people
People from Crevillent
Sportspeople from the Province of Alicante
Spanish footballers
Footballers from the Valencian Community
Association football defenders
Association football wingers
Association football utility players
La Liga players
Segunda División B players
Real Madrid Castilla footballers
Real Madrid CF players
RCD Espanyol footballers
CA Osasuna players
Atlético Madrid footballers
Campeonato Brasileiro Série A players
São Paulo FC players
UEFA Europa League winning players
Spain youth international footballers
Spain under-21 international footballers
Spain international footballers
UEFA Euro 2012 players
2014 FIFA World Cup players
UEFA Euro 2016 players
UEFA European Championship-winning players
Spanish expatriate footballers
Expatriate footballers in Brazil
Spanish expatriate sportspeople in Brazil